Meelis Muhu (born 11 August 1972 in Paide) is an Estonian documentary film director, producer and actor.

2003-2010 he worked at Ministry of Culture's department of arts.

Selected filmography and film roles
 1995: Wikmani poisid (television series; role: Vare)
 2008: "Aljoša" (documentary film; director)
 2009: "Kihnu kosjad" (documentary film; director)
 2009: "Kihnu pulm" (documentary film; director)

References

Living people
1972 births
Estonian film directors
Estonian male television actors
Tallinn University alumni
People from Paide